Henry Carpenter D.D. (1606–1662) was a Canon of Windsor for a short period in 1662.

Career

He was educated at Exeter College, Oxford where he graduated B.A. in 1624, DD in 1662.

He was appointed:
Vicar of Holy Trinity Church, Coventry 1633 – 1636
Rector of Greatford, Lincolnshire 1635 – 1636
Vicar of Steeple Ashton, Wiltshire 1636 – 1660
Rector of Hilperton, Wiltshire 1638 – 1662
Chaplain to the Speaker of the House of Commons 1660
Prebendary of Yetminster in Salisbury Cathedral 1660
Rector of St Dionis Backchurch, London 1661 – 1662
Rector of Stapleford Tawney, Essex 1661 – 1662

He was appointed to the seventh stall in St George's Chapel, Windsor Castle in 1662.

Notes 

1606 births
1662 deaths
Canons of Windsor
Alumni of Exeter College, Oxford